The Babil governorate election of 2013 was held on 20 April 2013 alongside elections for all other governorates outside Iraqi Kurdistan, Kirkuk, Anbar, and Nineveh.

Results 

|- style="background-color:#E9E9E9"
!align="left" colspan=2 valign=top|Party/Coalition!! Allied national parties !! Leader !!Seats !! Change !!Votes
|-
|bgcolor="#FF0000"|
|align=left|State of Law Coalition || ||Nouri Al-Maliki|| 8 || - || 142,568
|-
|bgcolor="#009933"|
|align=left|Citizens Alliance ||align=left| || Ammar al-Hakim|| 7 || 2 || 115,188
|-
|bgcolor="#262E3D"|
|align=left|Independent Iraqi Qualifications Gathering || || || 4 || 4 || 69,087
|-
|bgcolor="#000000"|
|align=left|Liberal Coalition|| || Muqtada al-Sadr || 4 || 1 || 51,869
|-
|bgcolor="#2D6186"|
|align=left|Babil Civil Alliance || || || 2 || 2 || 30,578
|-
|bgcolor="#098DCD"|
|align=left|Al Iraqia National and United Coalition || || || 1 || 2 || 24,227
|-
|bgcolor="#1C3973"|
|align=left|Iraq’s National Coalition || || || 1 || 1 || 20,755
|-
|bgcolor="#286F42"|
|align=left|Islamic Dawa Party - Iraq Organization|| || || 1 || 1 || 19,527
|-
|
|align=left|National Partnership Gathering || || || 1 || 1 || 18,565
|-
|
|align=left|Al Amin Coalition || || || 1 || 1 || 16,865
|-
|
|align=left|Iraqia Babel || MuttahidoonArabian Al Iraqia || || 1 || 1 || 12,754
|-
|
|align=left|Iraq’s Advocates for State Support|| || || || || 11,798
|-
|bgcolor="#F6BE22"|
|align=left|Iraq’s Benevolence and Generosity List|| || || ||  || 4,849
|-
|
|align=left|National Moderation Front || || || || || 3,580
|-
|bgcolor="#6398FE"|
|align=left|National White Bloc || || || || || 2,899
|-
|
|align=left|Sons of the City Bloc || || || || || 2,002
|-
|
|align=left|Iraqi Commission of Independent Civil Society Organizations || || || || || 1,560
|-
|colspan=2 align=left|Total || || || 31 || - || 548,671
|-
|colspan=7 align=left|Sources: ISW, al-Sumaria - Babil Coalitions, IHEC Babil Results

References 

2013 Iraqi governorate elections